Puerto Rico Highway 8 (PR-8) is a main highway that serves as a third route (the others being PR-3 and PR-26) from San Juan, Puerto Rico to Carolina, Puerto Rico. It is, still, a highly congested highway, noticeable when congestion jams are found in PR-17 where PR-8 begins and it continues to PR-3. The first kilometers of PR-8 (east of PR-17) were known before as Puerto Rico Highway 4, but the Department of Transportation renumbered the entire highway PR-8 and there is no longer a PR-4. It ends in PR-3 in Carolina.

Major intersections

See also

 List of highways numbered 8

References

External links
 

008
Roads in San Juan, Puerto Rico